Auchenbowie House is a laird's house (mansion) in Stirling, Scotland.

The land here was bought by Robert Bruce, Provost of Stirling (descendant of The Bruce) in 1555. The Laird's House was built during the 17th century, 1666 according to one source. According to The Times, it was "built as an L-plan towerhouse ... extended in 1768 and again in the 19th century to create a capacious nine-bedroom, four-bathroom property".

The house was later expanded and remodelled in 1768, and again in the 19th century. It's located in the Stirling region of Auchenbowie.

It passed through marriage to the Monro family in 1708 after one of the Bruce family had to flee Scotland following the killing of a man in a duel. The Monro family were the owners in 1787 when Robert Burns, the Scots national makar (or poet) stayed and wrote in his journal about dining with the Monro of the day who was also a poet.

Former British Prime Minister, Winston Churchill, also stayed at the House when visiting a niece that had married into the Munro family.

On September 5, 1973, it was designated a category A listed building.

Little has been written about recent owners, but The Times indicated that Connie and Robert Donnelly had moved in 2012.

A report about the House in 2019 stated that "the original L-shaped plan remains essentially intact" and added that it has been remodeled, then featuring nine bedrooms, stables and tennis courts.

References 

Category A listed buildings in Stirling (council area)
Houses in Stirling (council area)